Persian Gate or the Susian Gate was the ancient name of the pass now known as Tang-e Meyran, connecting Yasuj with Sedeh Eghlid to the east, crossing the border of the modern Kohgiluyeh va Boyer Ahmad and Fars provinces of Iran, passing south of the Kuh-e-Dinar massif, part of the Zagros Mountains. 

The pass controls the link between the shore and the central part of Persia.  

In the early weeks of 330 BC, it was the site of the fierce Battle of the Persian Gate, in which the Macedonian king Alexander the Great faced stiff resistance by the last Achaemenid troops commanded by Ariobarzan.

References

Further reading

External links
Livius.org: Persian Gate

Wars of Alexander the Great
History of Kohgiluyeh and Boyer-Ahmad Province
History of Fars Province
Mountain passes of Iran